Scaeosopha tuberculata is a species of moth of the family Cosmopterigidae. It is found in China.

The wingspan is about 17.5 mm. The ground colour of the forewings is yellow with dark spots and patches. The hindwings are dark yellowish-brown.

Etymology
The species name refers to the distal seventh of the valvella expanded to a tuberculum and is derived from Latin tuberculatus (meaning tuberculum).

References

Moths described in 2012
Scaeosophinae